Milciades Arturo "Junior" Noboa Díaz (born November 10, 1964) is a Dominican former professional baseball second baseman. He played in Major League Baseball (MLB) for the Cleveland Indians, California Angels, Montreal Expos, New York Mets, Oakland Athletics, and Pittsburgh Pirates.

Noboa also served as the hitting coach for the Dominican Republic National Team during the 2006, 2009, and 2017 World Baseball Classic.

He currently works in the Arizona Diamondbacks front office as Vice President, Latin Operations. In his current role, Noboa oversees the D-backs' baseball academy in Boca Chica in the Dominican Republic and serves as the team's liaison to its Latin American prospects. Under Noboa's tenure, he has aided in the signing of Miguel Montero, Gerardo Parra, Ender Inciarte, Carlos Gonzalez, and José Valverde. Noboa has also led a first of its kind education program for Latin American players and hosted Ken Kendrick, Derrick Hall, and other members of the Diamondbacks staff in the Dominican Republic for scouting purposes.

He is also the second cousin of Chris Noboa, producer formerly from The Howard Stern Channels and The Scott Ferrall Show on Sirius XM radio.

References

External links

1964 births
Living people
Arizona Diamondbacks scouts
Buffalo Bisons (minor league) players
Caimanes del Sur players
California Angels players
Cleveland Indians players
Dominican Republic baseball coaches
Dominican Republic expatriate baseball players in Canada
Dominican Republic expatriate baseball players in the United States
Dominican Republic national baseball team people
Edmonton Trappers players
Indianapolis Indians players

Maine Guides players
Major League Baseball players from the Dominican Republic
Major League Baseball second basemen
Montreal Expos players
New York Mets players
Oakland Athletics players
Pittsburgh Pirates players
Rochester Red Wings players
Tidewater Tides players
Waterloo Indians players
People from Azua Province